Głowaczów  is a village in Kozienice County, Masovian Voivodeship, in east-central Poland. It is the seat of the gmina (administrative district) called Gmina Głowaczów. The village has a population of 780.

Głowaczów was founded in 1445 by a nobleman named Sędziwój Leżeński Głowacz (Nałęcz coat of arms), and later on, it belonged to the families of Leżeński, Boski and Ostroróg. The town with its two churches (one from 1390, another from 1445) was destroyed by Swedish invaders in the deluge (1655). New church was built in 1675, to be destroyed by Germans in 1944. Until 1795 (see Partitions of Poland), Głowaczów belonged to Lesser Poland's Sandomierz Voivodeship, and in the 19th century, it was part of Russian-controlled Congress Poland (1815 - 1915). In the second half of the 17th century, Głowaczów emerged as a local center of Jewish culture. Here, on February 15, 1864, one of battles of the January Uprising took place, and in 1869, the Russians stripped it of its town charter. In 1921, already in Second Polish Republic’s Kielce Voivodeship, Głowaczów had 2271 inhabitants, including 1411 Jews.

In September 1939, several skirmishes between the advancing Wehrmacht and the retreating units of Armia Prusy took place here. The village was partly destroyed, and in the spring 1940, all residents of Głowaczów were forced to leave their houses, as German authorities built airforce training facilities. Its Jewish residents were murdered in late 1942 in Treblinka extermination camp.

References

External links
 Jewish Community in Głowaczów on Virtual Shtetl

Villages in Kozienice County
Radom Governorate
Kielce Voivodeship (1919–1939)
Holocaust locations in Poland